Patrick H. Hase is a historian specialized in the history of the New Territories, Hong Kong. He is a retired civil servant of British Hong Kong, living there from 1972 to present (as of 2020).

Biography
Patrick Hase started working in Hong Kong in 1972. In the first six months of his arrival, the British Hong Kong government assigned him to study Cantonese, eventually he became fluent in it. In the 1980s, he worked as the district officer of Sha Tin District. He retired as assistant director for social welfare in 1996.

Bibliography
Patrick Hase's bibliography includes:
Books
 
 
 
 
 

Book chapters
 
 

Journal articles

Distinctions
 PhD, University of Cambridge
 Former President, Royal Asiatic Society Hong Kong Branch

References

Year of birth missing (living people)
Living people
20th-century Hong Kong historians
Historians of Hong Kong
Hong Kong civil servants
Government officials of Hong Kong
Alumni of the University of Cambridge
21st-century Hong Kong historians